The Pudsey by-election was a Parliamentary by-election held on 20 June 1908. The constituency returned one Member of Parliament (MP) to the House of Commons of the United Kingdom, elected by the first past the post voting system.

The by-election was caused when the Member of Parliament, the Rt. Hon. George Whiteley resigned from Parliament by accepting appointment as Steward of the Manor of Northstead.

Electoral history

Candidates
Frederick Ogden, John James Oddy and J. W. Benson were the three candidates. Eccentric poet Arthur Hunnable announced that he would contest the election, but failed to submit nomination papers.

Campaign
Polling Day was arranged for 20 June 1908, just 18 days after the retirement of the previous MP.

Result

Aftermath
On 26 June, it was announced that Whiteley, the former MP, had been awarded a peerage and would take a seat in the House of Lords.

References 

By-elections to the Parliament of the United Kingdom in Leeds constituencies
1908 in England
1908 elections in the United Kingdom
Pudsey
1900s in Leeds